Nobleton may refer to:

Places
Canada
Nobleton, Ontario
Nobleton Airport, in Ontario
United States
Nobleton, Florida
Nobleton, Wisconsin